Iain Davidson (born 14 January 1984) is a Scottish professional footballer and currently plays for Lowland league Football League side Cowdenbeath, in his second spell at the club. Davidson mainly plays as a defensive midfielder but can also be played in the defence. He has previously played for Brechin City, Scarborough, two spells at Raith Rovers and Dundee.

In 2009, while he was captain at Raith Rovers, Davidson was charged and convicted of assault during an incident at Kitty’s Bar and Club in Kirkcaldy. He was convicted of attacking a man with a bottle. 

In 2021 the SFA found Davidson guilty of racist and discriminatory behaviour towards an Inverness player. He received a four match ban and was ordered to complete a FIFA e-learning course before being allowed to play again. 

In 2022 Davidson pled guilty to behaving in a threatening/abusive manner, aggravated by the fact it involved abuse of his former partner. He was given a six month suspended custodial sentence for good behaviour and a six month non-harassment order against his former partner. He is due to appear in court again on 6th June 2023.

Career
Davidson started his career on the books of Sunderland, but was released in 2003. He headed back to Scotland to sign with part-timers Brechin City, but only lasted six games at Glebe Park before heading back to England to play a couple of games with Scarborough.

Upon his release from the now defunct Yorkshire side, Davidson returned to his home town of Kirkcaldy to sign for Raith Rovers. Despite having his injury troubles, Davidson was appointed team captain.

Davidson signed a one-year contract with Dundee in June 2012., where he spent 3 seasons.

On 14 May 2015, Davidson was released from Dundee alongside teammate Jamie Reid by mutual consent. On 8 August 2015, it was announced that Davidson had signed back at Raith Rovers. On 15 July 2020, it was announced Davidson had signed for another season, his 14th with the club. Davidson left Raith Rovers in May 2021, at the end of the season, the third player to have played over 500 games for the club.

In June 2021, Davidson returned to Brechin City, now in the Highland Football League.

Career statistics

References

External links
 (misspelt)

Living people
1984 births
Footballers from Kirkcaldy
Scottish footballers
Scarborough F.C. players
Raith Rovers F.C. players
Association football defenders
Association football midfielders
Scottish Football League players
Brechin City F.C. players
Sunderland A.F.C. players
National League (English football) players
Dundee F.C. players
Scottish Premier League players
Scottish Professional Football League players